Tombus virus defective interfering (DI) RNA region 3 is an important cis-regulatory region identified in the 3' UTR of Tombusvirus defective interfering particles (DI).

Defective interfering RNAs are small sub-viral replicons which are non-coding deletion mutants of the virus that maintain cis-acting RNA elements necessary for replication of the host virus. This conserved region of the 3'UTR has been found to enhance DI RNA accumulation by approximately 10-fold as well as mediating viral replication.

See also
 Infectious bronchitis virus D-RNA
 Red clover necrotic mosaic virus translation enhancer elements

References

External links
 

Cis-regulatory RNA elements
Tombusviridae